Ranga Nath Poudyal Atri popularly known as Ranganath Pandit was the Mukhtiyar of Nepal from 1837 December to 1838 August and in 1840 November for about 2–3 weeks. He was the first Brahmin Prime Minister of Nepal.

Early life
Ranga Nath Poudyal Atri was born in 1773 A.D. at Makhantole Kathmandu to Pandit Brajnath Atri, a who was prominent courtier in the palace who was later exiled to Benaras. He was a Bahun by ethnicity. Ranga Nath Poudyal Atri spent his childhood years in Benares, where he mastered Sanskrit. He was granted the title "Pandit Raj" by the then king of Benares.

Political career

Ranga Nath Poudyal Atri met Bhimsen Thapa in Benares (Varanasi). He was deeply influenced by Bhimsen Thapa and thus he forged his path to power by establishing himself as the prominent supporter of Bhimsen Thapa. After the execution of Mulkaji (Chief Kaji) Damodar Pande, Paudyal was appointed as Raj Guru (Royal Preceptor) along with Ranajit Pande as appointed as Mulkaji, Bhimsen Thapa as second Kaji and Sher Bahadur Shah as Mul Chautariya. He became Prime Minister of Nepal at the time of utmost political turmoil. He is remembered as a clever Brahmin . Although he was the prominent supporter of Bhimsen Thapa  His political career was doomed after the downfall of Bhimsen Thapa. He is often characterized as the spiritual advisor of the court rather than a powerful governor.

Personal life
Not much is known about his personal life. He is believed by many to be spiritual minded.

See also
Brian Houghton Hodgson
Bhimsen Thapa
Puskar Shah
Bal Chandra Poudel

References

Bibliography

Prime ministers of Nepal
1773 births
People from Kathmandu
Year of death missing
Mukhtiyars
19th-century prime ministers of Nepal
19th-century Nepalese nobility
Nepalese Hindus